Mitromorpha punctata is a species of sea snail, a marine gastropod mollusk in the family Mitromorphidae.

Description
The length of the shell varies between 6 mm and 12.1 mm.

Distribution
This marine species occurs off the Philippines.

References

External links
 

punctata
Gastropods described in 2009